The Investigation Bureau for Railway, Funicular and Boat Accidents (IRFBA; , UUS; , SEA; , SII) was an agency of the government of Switzerland. In 2011, it was replaced by the Swiss Transportation Safety Investigation Board.

Description 

Its head office was in Bern, and it had an eastern Switzerland office in Schlieren. It investigated accidents and incidents concerning railway systems, funicular systems, and boats.

The agency was disestablished on 1 November 2011 when it and the Aircraft Accident Investigation Bureau merged to form the Swiss Accident Investigation Board.

See also
 Fiesch derailment

Notes and references

External links
 Official website

Government of Switzerland
Rail accident investigators
Organizations disestablished in 2011